The Frankfurt Grand Prix was a men's tennis tournament played in Frankfurt West Germany from 1980 until 1982. The event was part of the Grand Prix tennis circuit and was held on indoor carpet courts. After the 1982 edition tournament director Hans Burkert moved the event to Lisbon where it was known as the Lights Cup.

Finals

Singles

Doubles

References

External links
 ATP results archive

Grand Prix tennis circuit
Defunct tennis tournaments in Germany
Carpet court tennis tournaments
Indoor tennis tournaments
Sports competitions in Frankfurt